Rotonda is an EP by Filipino rapper Gloc-9. It is Gloc-9's second EP after the EP Limang Kanta Lang which was released independently in 2006. Also, this EP is his comeback record on Universal Records after his one-project deal with Star Music. The album includes the track "Rotonda" which features Joey Ayala and the album's carrier single "Ice Tubig", a collaboration with Mike Luis.

Track listing

References

Gloc-9 albums
2017 EPs